Nicolae Petrașcu may refer to several people:
Nicolae Pătrașcu (ca. 1584–1627), outcast Prince of Wallachia
N. Petrașcu (1859–1944), Romanian critic
Nicolae Petrașcu (1907–1968), Iron Guard militant